Salomon Gessner (1730–1788) was a Swiss painter, graphic artist, government official, newspaper publisher and poet; best known in the latter instance for his Idylls.

Biography 
His father, Hans Konrad Gessner (1696–1775), was a printer, publisher, bookseller and member of the High Council of Zürich. From the age of six until his death, he lived in a home his father bought, at Münstergasse 9. He began an apprenticeship in 1749, at a bookshop in Berlin, but stayed for only a year, having decided to devote himself to landscape painting and etching. After a short stay in Hamburg, where he encountered the poetic works of Karl Wilhelm Ramler and Friedrich von Hagedorn, he also developed an interest in poetry.

He returned home, without definite plans, but felt uninclined to take part in his father's business. Instead, he joined a group of young men known as Dienstags-Compagnie, that met for discussions and social activities at the homes of their parents (in winter) or at a vineyard clubhouse in Selnau. There, they became enraptured by "Naturschwärmerei" (nature enthusiasm or enchantment) and fancied themselves to be ancient shepherds.

His first published poem was Lied eines Schweizers an sein bewaffnetes Mädchen and his first painting was Die Nacht (1753). His next, longer poem, Daphnis (1754), was inspired by a translation of Longus by Jacques Amyot. The first edition of what would become his best known work, Idyllen, appeared in 1756 and a volume of collected works was issued in 1762. From then until 1772, he concentrated on painting.

In 1761, he was a co-founder of the Helvetic Society and, that same year, against fierce opposition, married Judith Heidegger (1736–1818), the daughter of one of his father's competitors. A son, Konrad, was born the following year.

In 1765, he was elected to represent the porcelain guild on the Zürich High Council. After 1776, he held the same office for Wipkingen.

In 1780, he began publishing and editing the Zürcher Zeitung, which became the Neue Zürcher Zeitung in 1821. From 1781 until his death, he held the title of "Sihlherr", the senior administrator of Sihlwald, and was responsible for supplying firewood to Zürich. He spent the summers there, at a cabin in the forest.

In 1792/93, the Gessner Monument was erected in Platzspitz park. Another monument dedicated to him in Bad Dürkheim was destroyed by the French in 1794. A commemorative plaque has been placed on his lifelong home. Several streets and a bridge have been named after him.

Works 
 Idyllen. Gessner, Zürich 1756. (Digitalized copy, online @ the Deutsches Textarchiv)
 In 1776, George Robinson in London published an English translation of Gessner's work as New Idylles.
His collected works were self-published in Zürich from 1777 to 1778. (2 volumes, Digitalisate, by the ). They were translated into French, published in Paris (1786–1793), and Amsterdam (1784) 3 volumes. Juliane Giovane translated the Idyllen into Italian. 
The German edition was reissued in Leipzig in 1841. His Briefwechsel mit seinem Sohn appeared in Bern and Zürich in 1801. Juliane Giovane translated the Idyllen into Italian.

References

Further reading
 Martin Bircher, et al., Salomon Gessner: Maler und Dichter der Idylle 1730–1788. Herzog August Bibliothek, Wolfenbüttel 1982,  (exhibition catalog).
 Paul Leemann-van Elck: Salomon Gessner. Sein Lebensbild mit beschreibenden Verzeichnissen seiner literarischen und künstlerischen Werke. Orell Füssli, Zürich/Leipzig 1930 (Monograph on Swiss Art #6).

External links 

 More works by Gessner @ ArtNet
 
 
 
 
 
 

1730 births
1788 deaths
Artists from Zürich
18th-century Swiss poets
Swiss male poets
18th-century Swiss painters
18th-century Swiss male artists
Swiss male painters
18th-century male writers